Héctor Luis Vega Astudillo (born 13 December 1967) is a Chilean former professional footballer who played as a attacking midfielder for clubs in Chile, Peru and Ecuador.

Club career
Vega was born in Pueblo Nuevo neighborhood from Iquique and played for the local club, Unión Pueblo Nuevo.

A product of Deportes Iquique youth system, he made his debut in 1985. When the club was relegated to the second level of the Chilean football, in 1992 he moved to Peru and joined Deportivo Yurimaguas. In Peru, he also played for Deportivo Sipesa (1995) and Sport Boys (1996). To Deportes Iquique, he returned three times: 1993, 1997 and 2001.

After playing for S.D. Quito, in 1999 he returned to Chile and joined Santiago Wanderers in the Primera B, getting promotion to the Primera División after the club was the runner-up of the season. His last club was Everton de Viña del Mar in 2002.

Personal life
Vega is well-known by his nickname Caldillo (Fish Soup) what was inherited from his father.

He is the father of the Peruvian-Chilean former professional footballer of the same name Héctor Fabrizzio Vega, who was born in Lima, Peru, when his father played for Deportivo Yurimaguas.

In 2001, he earned 457 millions Chilean pesos by playing Loto, a game of chance. After mismanagement of the award money, he worked as manager of a pizzeria, as a truck driver in the mining industry and in the port of Iquique (ITI).

In the context of COVID-19 pandemic, he and his son started a football academy named "Imperio H" in Iquique, making links with clubs in both Chile and Mexico.

Honours
Deportes Iquique
 Primera B de Chile (1):

References

External links
 Héctor Vega at MemoriaWanderers 
 Héctor Vega at PlaymakerStats.com

1967 births
Living people
People from Iquique
Chilean footballers
Chilean expatriate footballers
Association football midfielders
Deportes Iquique footballers
Coquimbo Unido footballers
Deportivo Sipesa footballers
Sport Boys footballers
S.D. Quito footballers
Santiago Wanderers footballers
Everton de Viña del Mar footballers
Chilean Primera División players
Primera B de Chile players
Peruvian Primera División players
Ecuadorian Serie A players
Chilean expatriate sportspeople in Peru
Chilean expatriate sportspeople in Ecuador
Expatriate footballers in Peru
Expatriate footballers in Ecuador
Chilean football managers